Johnny Chiang Chi-chen (born 2 March 1972) is a Taiwanese politician. He was the penultimate Director-General of the Government Information Office from 2010 to 2011, a post he resigned to become a member of the Legislative Yuan in which he has served since 2012. In March 2020, he was elected the Chairman of the Kuomintang and assumed office on 9 March until he was succeeded by Eric Chu on 5 October 2021.

Early education
Chiang was born on 2 March 1972. He attended elementary and junior high school in his hometown of Taichung before studying diplomacy at National Chengchi University.

He served in the ROC Army Special Force 101 Amphibious Reconnaissance Battalion during his compulsory military service. He was honorably discharged from ROC Army with the rank of corporal.

He earned a master's degree from the University of Pittsburgh, followed by a doctorate at the University of South Carolina, both in the United States of America.

Early career
Then, he taught at Soochow University, and worked in multiple positions at the Taiwan Institute of Economic Research.

Political career
He was named the head of the Government Information Office in 2010. When Chiang was selected as a Kuomintang candidate for the legislature in April 2011, he resigned the GIO position and was replaced by Philip Yang. Chiang was one of five former GIO officials to appear on the ballot. He won election in 2012, and again in 2016. Chiang was chosen as one of five conveners of the Legislative Yuan's constitutional amendment committee in 2015. He shared foreign and national defense committee convener duties with Liu Shih-fang in 2016. Chiang announced his intention to contest the Taichung mayoralty in October 2017, becoming the second Kuomintang politician after Lu Shiow-yen to declare interest in the position. It was reported in February 2018 that Chiang had narrowly finished second to Lu in three different public opinion polls that served as the Kuomintang's Taichung mayoral primary. Chiang declared his candidacy for the 2020 Kuomintang chairmanship election on 25 January 2020, ten days after Wu Den-yih resigned the position. Chiang defeated Hau Lung-pin in the leadership election, held on 7 March 2020. Chiang took office as Kuomintang chairman on 9 March 2020.

In March 2021, KMT chairman Johnny Chiang rejected the "one country, two systems" as a feasible model for Taiwan, citing Beijing's response to protests in Hong Kong as well as the value that Taiwanese place in political freedoms. In September of that year, Chiang lost his bid to retain the chairmanship, finishing third behind Eric Chu and Chang Ya-chung.

Personal
Chiang is of Hakka descent from Teochew people. He is married to the daughter of former legislator Liu Shen-liang, with whom he has two children.

References

|-

1972 births
Living people
Kuomintang Members of the Legislative Yuan in Taiwan
Members of the 8th Legislative Yuan
Members of the 9th Legislative Yuan
Taichung Members of the Legislative Yuan
National Chengchi University alumni
University of Pittsburgh alumni
University of South Carolina alumni
Academic staff of Soochow University (Taiwan)
Members of the 10th Legislative Yuan
Taiwanese expatriates in the United States
Government ministers of Taiwan
Chairpersons of the Kuomintang
Taiwanese politicians of Hakka descent